Fulata (died 1694) was Governor-General of Nanjing (1688–94).  A nephew of Mingju (President of the Ministry of Punishments; Director of the Imperial Household; President of the censorate), he was an imperial clansman, who rose rapidly by service in Beijing and the provinces to be Viceroy of Liangjiang in 1688, a post he filled until his death. The Kangxi Emperor described him as the only fit successor to Yu Chenglong: "a man of peace without weakness, not afraid of responsibility, and devoted to the people." Canonised, he was included in the Temple of Worthies.

References

1694 deaths
Irgen Gioro
Manchu politicians
Governors-general
Qing dynasty politicians
Political office-holders in Jiangsu
Year of birth unknown
Viceroys of Liangjiang